Silver River may refer to the following streams in the U.S. state of Michigan:

 Silver River (Keweenaw County), drains to Lake Superior
 Silver River (Baraga County), drains to Huron Bay on Lake Superior
 Silver River (Baraga–Houghton counties), drains to the Sturgeon River

Rivers of Michigan
Set index articles on rivers of Michigan